Victoria Cup may refer to:

 Victoria Cup (ice hockey) - annual challenge cup ice hockey match held in Europe
 Victoria Cup (harness race) - annual horse race in Australia
 Victoria Cup (rugby union) - Africa rugby series
 Victoria Cup (horse race) - British horse race